Erythrite or red cobalt is a secondary hydrated cobalt arsenate mineral with the formula . Erythrite and annabergite, chemical formula , or nickel arsenate form a complete series with the general formula .

Erythrite crystallizes in the monoclinic system and forms prismatic crystals. The color is crimson to pink and occurs as a secondary coating known as cobalt bloom on cobalt arsenide minerals. Well-formed crystals are rare, with most of the mineral manifesting in crusts or small reniform aggregates.

Erythrite was first described in 1832 for an occurrence in Grube Daniel, Schneeberg, Saxony, and takes its name from the Greek έρυθρος (erythros), meaning red. Historically, erythrite itself has not been an economically important mineral, but the prospector may use it as a guide to associated cobalt and native silver.

Erythrite occurs as a secondary mineral in the oxide zone of Co–Ni–As bearing mineral deposits. It occurs in association with cobaltite, skutterudite, symplesite, roselite-beta, scorodite, pharmacosiderite, adamite, morenosite, retgersite, and malachite.

Notable localities are Cobalt, Ontario; La Cobaltera, Chile, Schneeberg, Saxony, Germany; Joachimsthal, Czech Republic; Cornwall, England; Bou Azzer, Morocco; the Blackbird mine, Lemhi County, Idaho; Sara Alicia mine, near Alamos, Sonora, Mexico; Mt. Cobalt, Queensland and the Dome Rock copper mine, Mingary, South Australia.

Other varieties
The nickel variety, annabergite, occurs as a light green nickel bloom on nickel arsenides. In addition iron, magnesium and zinc can also substitute for the cobalt position, creating three other minerals: parasymplesite (Fe), hörnesite (Mg) and köttigite (Zn).

References

Further reading
Dana's Manual of Mineralogy 
Manual of Mineral Science, 22nd Ed. C. Klein.
 

Cobalt minerals
Arsenate minerals
Monoclinic minerals
Minerals in space group 12
Vivianite group